Hu Chengzhi (23 August 1917 – 12 April 2018) was a Chinese paleontologist and paleoanthropologist. He made the plaster casts of the Peking Man skull in the 1930s, and identified the Yuanmou Man (Homo erectus yuanmouensis) based on fossils collected by others. He discovered the first fossil of Keichousaurus in 1957, and this species, K. hui, is named after him. A new hadrosaur discovered in Shandong is designated Shantungosaurus giganteus by Hu in 1973.

Hu left school at 13 owing to poverty, and worked at Peking Union Medical College as Davidson Black's assistant. After Black died in 1934, Hu became an apprentice technician for fixing fossils at Franz Weidenreich's laboratory. He made cast copies of Peking Man's skull, and he was the last Chinese eyewitness of the Peking Man fossils, before they were lost during the Second Sino-Japanese War. Hu resigned from the institute in 1947. In the early 1950s, he began to work at the Ministry of Geology.

Hu died in Beijing on 12 April 2018, aged 100.

References 

1917 births
2018 deaths
Chinese paleontologists
Chinese paleoanthropologists
Chinese centenarians
Men centenarians
Biologists from Shandong
People of the Republic of China